The 1987 Seiko Super Tennis Hong Kong, also known as the Hong Kong Open, was a men's tennis tournament played on indoor hard courts at the Victoria Park Tennis Centre in Hong Kong that was part of the 1987 Nabisco Grand Prix tennis circuit. It was the 15th edition of the tournament and was held from 26 October through 1 November 1987. Third-seeded Eliot Teltscher, who entered the main draw via a wildcard, won the singles title.

Finals

Singles
 Eliot Teltscher defeated  John Fitzgerald 6–7(6–8), 3–6, 6–1, 6–2, 7–5
 It was Teltscher's only singles title of the year and the 10th and last of his career.

Doubles
 Mark Kratzmann /  Jim Pugh defeated  Marty Davis /  Brad Drewett 6–7, 6–4, 6–2
 It was Kratzmann's 2nd and last doubles title of the year and the 3rd of his career. It was Pugh's 3rd and last doubles title of the year and of his career.

References

External links
 ITF tournament edition details

Seiko Super Tennis Hong Kong
Hong Kong Open (tennis)
1987 in Hong Kong sport